Veronika Mikulášková (born 16 October 2000) is a Czech handballer for DHK Baník Most and the Czech national team.

She participated at the 2018 European Women's Handball Championship.

Achievements
Czech First Division:
Winner: 2018

References

External links

2000 births
Living people
Sportspeople from Olomouc
Czech female handball players